The Madina Mosque or Madina Masjid, also known as the "Wolseley Road Mosque", is the first purpose-built mosque in Sheffield, South Yorkshire, England. After some  problems with funding, the project was completed in October 2006. Users of the mosque raised several million pounds to pay for the new mosque and Islamic centre which includes 19 rooms and two large halls, a library and a day centre. The project is estimated to have cost £5 million. The mosque was built on Glover Road, Sheffield, and intended to serve the Muslim populations of Nether Edge and Sharrow. The mosque has a capacity of 2,300 (including women).

The organization, 'Muslims in Britain' classify the masjid as, "Sufi - Bareilvi".

It is hoped that the mosque will also unite local communities, and local feedback so far indicates this. The mosque's administration adheres to the Barelvi movement.

See also
 Islam in the United Kingdom
 Islamic schools and branches
 Islamism
 List of mosques in the United Kingdom

References

External links

  Sheffield Islamic Centre Madina Masjid Trust

Barelvi mosques
Mosques in England
Religious buildings and structures in Sheffield
Mosques completed in 2006
Sufi mosques
21st-century mosques
Mosque buildings with domes